The Fleur de Lis Stakes is a Grade III  American Thoroughbred horse race for fillies and mares age three and older over a distance of  miles on the dirt run annually in mid-June at Churchill Downs in Louisville, Kentucky.

History

The event was inaugurated on 31 May 1975 as the Fleur de Lis Handicap and was won by the favorite Bundler defeating four other runners on a sloppy track in the time of 1:39 over the mile distance. The event was held over the same distance for one more year before being extended to  miles.

The event is named after the English translation for the French "fleur-de-lis", a flower of the lily. The lily is the symbol of the Louisville flag, the location where the event is held. The lily has traditionally been used to represent French royalty and Louisville, named for the French king Louis XVI.

In 1983 the distance for the event was increased to  miles.

The event's condition from 1983–85 and 1987–89 was for four-year-olds & older.

The event was upgraded to Grade III in 1988 and again to Grade II in 2002.

Since 2015 the event has been a Breeders' Cup Challenge "Win and You’re In" for the Distaff Division.

The event has gained status over the recent years and has attracted some fine horses including the 2009 US Horse of the Year Rachel Alexandra who easily won the race as a short favorite by the near stakes record of  lengths.

Records
Speed record: 
 miles: 1:48.26 – Heritage of Gold (2000)

Margins 
 11 lengths – Lt. Lao  (1988)

Most wins
 2 – Likely Exchange (1978, 1980)

Most wins by a jockey
 3 – Shane Sellers (1995, 1998, 2000)
 3 – Calvin H. Borel (1997, 2009, 2010)
 3 – José Ortiz (2018, 2019, 2021)

Most wins by a trainer
 4 – William I. Mott (1984, 1998, 2012, 2019)
 3 – Claude R. McGaughey III (1982, 1983, 1990)

Winners

See also
List of American and Canadian Graded races

References

Graded stakes races in the United States
Horse races in the United States
Mile category horse races for fillies and mares
Recurring sporting events established in 1975
Churchill Downs horse races
1975 establishments in Kentucky
Grade 2 stakes races in the United States